Matheus de Sales Cabral (born 13 May 1995), known as Matheus Sales, is a Brazilian footballer who plays as a defensive midfielder for Atlético Goianiense, on loan from Coritiba.

Club career
Born in Guarulhos, São Paulo, Matheus Sales joined Palmeiras' youth setup in 2009, after being approved in a trial. In 2014, after being strongly linked to Internacional, he signed a new four-year deal with the club.

Matheus Sales made his first team – and Série A – debut on 25 October 2015, starting in a 0–2 home loss against Sport Recife. In the year's Copa do Brasil, he started in both legs of the final, earning plaudits for his performance on the second match.

Career statistics

Honours
Palmeiras
Copa do Brasil: 2015
Campeonato Brasileiro Série A: 2016
Bahia
Copa do Nordeste: 2017

References

External links
Palmeiras official profile 

1995 births
Living people
People from Guarulhos
Footballers from São Paulo (state)
Brazilian footballers
Association football midfielders
Campeonato Brasileiro Série A players
Campeonato Brasileiro Série B players
Sociedade Esportiva Palmeiras players
Esporte Clube Bahia players
América Futebol Clube (MG) players
Figueirense FC players
Grêmio Novorizontino players
Coritiba Foot Ball Club players
Goiás Esporte Clube players